Vivy may refer to:

Vivy, Wallonia, a town in Belgium, now part of the municipality of Bouillon
Vivy, Maine-et-Loire, a French municipality in the Maine-et-Loire department
Grand-Vivy Castle in Switzerland
Petit-Vivy Castle in Switzerland
Vivy Yusof, Malaysian businesswoman
Vivy: Fluorite Eye's Song, an anime series

See also
Vivi (disambiguation)